Robert Bernard Cook (April 1, 1923 – October 11, 2004) was a player in the National Basketball League and National Basketball Association. He played with the Sheboygan Red Skins from 1948 to 1950. Previously, he had been drafted by the Fort Wayne Pistons of the Basketball Association of America in 1948.

He is buried with his wife, Verone, in Lake Geneva, Wisconsin, where he had owned a Ford dealership.

Career statistics

NBA
Source

Regular season

Playoffs

References

1923 births
2004 deaths
All-American college men's basketball players
American men's basketball players
Basketball coaches from Illinois
Basketball players from Illinois
Fort Wayne Pistons draft picks
Forwards (basketball)
Guards (basketball)
People from Harvard, Illinois
People from Lake Geneva, Wisconsin
Sheboygan Red Skins coaches
Sheboygan Red Skins players
Wisconsin Badgers baseball players
Wisconsin Badgers men's basketball players